The National Unity Party (PUN), known before 11 June 2017 as the Right, is a Moldovan political party founded in June 2017, having as its main political goal the unification with Romania of the territory between the rivers Prut and Nistru (also known as Bessarabia).

History
On 11 June 2017, the political party Dreapta, founded by Ana Guțu, changed its name to the National Unity Party of Moldova (PUN), at the extraordinary congress of the party. The former defense minister of Moldova, Anatol Șalaru, was elected PUN's executive president, and Ana Guțu was elected first vice president. Both are former members of the Liberal Party (PL).

At an extraordinary congress on 25 June 2017, the former president of Romania, Traian Băsescu, was elected honorary president.

Electoral results

References
http://adevarul.ro/moldova/politica/Salaru-partidul-unitatii-nationale-nu-finantat-romania-1_58ad71625ab6550cb8b52658/index.html
http://www.hotnews.ro/stiri-international-21838175-basescu-urma-participe-primul-congres-partidului-unitatii-nationale-chisinau-presa-moldoveana.htm
https://www.agerpres.ro/externe/2017/06/25/traian-basescu-ales-presedinte-de-onoare-al-partidului-unitatii-nationale-din-republica-moldova-17-52-38
http://www.e-democracy.md/parties/
http://evz.ro/basescu-si-a-lansat-partid-in-republica-moldova.html

2017 establishments in Moldova
Political parties established in 2017
Political parties in Moldova
Romanian nationalism in Moldova